Mike Hamrick is the former athletic director of the Marshall Thundering Herd. He previously served as AD for the UNLV Rebels,  East Carolina Pirates and UALR Trojans. He is a Marshall University alumnus. Hamrick stepped down as athletic director at Marshall to become a special assistant to university president, Jerome A. Gilbert on July 1, 2021.

References

External links
 Marshall profile

Year of birth missing (living people)
Living people
East Carolina Pirates athletic directors
Little Rock Trojans athletic directors
Marshall Thundering Herd athletic directors
Marshall Thundering Herd football players
Marshall University alumni
People from Clendenin, West Virginia
UNLV Rebels athletic directors